Bonnie Canino (born 11 January 1962) is a retired American boxer and kickboxer, and former world featherweight champion for two different associations. She also won world titles in kick boxing for two different associations.

She is the former IFBA World Feather weight champion and two time IBF World Featherweight title challenger. She is the former WAKO and World KICK Kickboxing Champion.

In 2014, Canino was inducted into the Women's International Boxing Hall of Fame in Fort Lauderdale, Florida.

Canino holds notable wins over Gloria Ramirez, Nora Daigle and Sue Chase in her career. She also lost bouts to Chevelle Hallback and Alicia Ashley.

Personal life
After retiring in 1999 from professional boxing, she worked at a car dealership and managed Ada Vélez, the first Puerto Rican woman to become a world boxing champion, and Yvonne Reiss, the WBC Women's Middleweight World Champion who won the title in 2006.

Since retiring from prize fighting she has become a boxing coach. She later opened her own karate and boxing gym.

She has organized the Women’s National Golden Gloves tournament.

Professional career
Bonnie Canino has in her professional kickboxing career had 35 fights, winning 28 of them. She was the KICK World Featherweight Champion, as well as the WAKO World Featherweight kickboxing champion between 1993 and 2000.

Alongside her kickboxing career, she participated in boxing bouts as well. She won her two fights, against April Griffith and Tina Speakman, by TKO and her third fight against Sue Chase by unanimous decision. She then challenged for the Women's IBF Featherweight title, but lost a unanimous decision against Deirdre Gogarty.

She would then challenge for the vacant IFBA Featherweight title against Beverly Szymanski, and win by unanimous decision. Her first title defense was a split decision win against Cora Webber.

She once against fought for the Women's IBF Featherweight title in 1998, but lost by way of TKO against Chevelle Hallback. Her second IFBA title defense was a unanimous decision win against Nora Daigle.

Championships and accomplishments 
International Women's Boxing Hall of Fame
IWBHF Class of 2014 Hall of Fame Inductee
International Female Boxers Association
IFBA World Featherweight Championship (126 lbs)
Two successful title defenses
World Association of Kickboxing Organizations
WAKO World Featherweight Kickboxing Championship
KICK Kickboxing
KICK World Featherweight Kickboxing Championship

Professional boxing record

Kickboxing record

|-  bgcolor=
|-  bgcolor="#CCFFCC"
| May 1995|| Win||align=left| Zulfia Koutdossova  || ? || ? || Decision (Unanimous) || 5 || 3:00|| 
|-
|-  bgcolor="#CCFFCC"
| November 1992|| Win||align=left| Sandra Strong || ? || United States || Decision (Unanimous) || 5 || 3:00|| 
|-
! style=background:white colspan=9 |
|-
|-  bgcolor="#CCFFCC"
| 23 November 1991|| Win||align=left| Tammy Hudson || ? || Rocky Point (Tampa), Florida, United States || Decision (Unanimous) || 5 || 3:00|| 
|-
|-  bgcolor="#CCFFCC"
| 1990|| Win||align=left| Kathy Long || ? || France || Decision (Unanimous) || 12 || 3:00|| 
|-
|-  bgcolor="#CCFFCC"
| 1986|| Win||align=left| Charli Carr || ? || United States || Decision (Unanimous) || 3 || 3:00|| 
|-
|-  bgcolor="#CCFFCC"
| 1986|| Win||align=left| Stacey Whirlwind  || ? || United States || TKO || 5 || 3:00|| 
|-
! style=background:white colspan=9 |
|-
|-  bgcolor="#CCFFCC"
| 1985|| Win||align=left| Linda Bear || ? || United States || Decision (Unanimous) || 5 || 3:00|| 
|-
|-
| colspan=9 | Legend:

References

External links
Official site

1962 births
Living people
American women boxers
Sportspeople from Miami
Boxers from Florida
American female kickboxers
American sportspeople of Puerto Rican descent
World boxing champions
World featherweight boxing champions
American female taekwondo practitioners
American wushu practitioners